Before the Fall is a 2008 Spanish thriller film with apocalyptic themes directed by F. Javier Gutiérrez which stars Víctor Clavijo, Mariana Cordero, and Eduard Fernández.

Plot 
Upon the news delivered by the UN Secretary General announcing the end of the world in 72 hours by an impact event, Ale decides to spend his time left drinking and listening music, but he has to deal with the arrival of mysterious Lucio, focusing then on helping his mother Rosa and his brother Tomás' four children instead.

Cast

Production 
The screenplay was penned by the director alongside Juan Velarde. The film is a Maestranza Films, Green Moon Producciones and Pentagrama Films production. It was shot in the province of Seville.

Release 
Selected in the 'Panorama' lineup of the 58th Berlin International Film Festival, the film was presented on 14 February 2008. It later screened at Málaga Film Festival's main competition on 5 April 2008. It was theatrically released in Spain on 25 April 2008.

Reception 
Jay Weissberg of Variety summed up the "unpleasant predictable" thriller as "usual psycho killer looking for revenge drama gets an end of the world overlay".

Jordi Costa of Fotogramas rated the film 3 out of 5 stars highlighting its "visual power" whilst citing its subpar writing as a negative point.

Rubén Romero of Cinemanía rated the film 3 out of 5 stars, considering that after achieving the most difficult, the director, displaying "clear symptoms of suffering from horror vacui", goes on making "unnecessary formal pirouettes and forced plot twists", albeit conceding that "all in all, [the films is] a good and necessary debut".

Accolades 

|-
| rowspan = "4" align = "center" | 2008 || rowspan = "4" | 11th Málaga Film Festival || colspan = "2" | Golden Biznaga ||  || rowspan = "4" align = "center" | 
|-
| Best Supporting Actress || Mariana Cordero || 
|-
| Best Makeup || Anabel Beato, Yolanda Piña || 
|-
| Best New Screenwriter || Juan Velarde, F. Javier Gutiérrez || 
|-
| rowspan = "6" align = "center" | 2009 
| rowspan = "3" | 64th CEC Medals || Best Cinematography || Miguel A. Mora ||  || rowspan = "3" | 
|-
| Best Editing || Nacho Ruiz Capillas || 
|-
| Best Newcomer || F. Javier Gutiérrez || 
|-
| 23rd Goya Awards || Best Sound || Daniel de Zayas, Jorge Marín, Maite Rivera ||  || align = "center" | 
|-
| rowspan = "2" | 18th Actors and Actresses Union Awards || Best Film Actor in a Leading Role || Víctor Clavijo ||  || rowspan = "2" | 
|-
| Best Film Actor in a Secondary Role || Eduard Fernández || 
|}

See also 
 List of Spanish films of 2008

References 

Films about impact events
Spanish thriller films
2000s Spanish-language films
2008 thriller films
Films shot in the province of Seville
Maestranza Films films
2000s Spanish films